Wickenburg Unified School District #9 (WUSD) is a school district headquartered in Wickenburg, Arizona.

History

In 1997 the question of whether the Wickenburg district and the Congress Elementary School District should merge was put on the ballot in both districts.
 Wickenburg USD residents voted in favor.

In 2020 Barbara Remondini became the superintendent.

On June 30, 2021, the Walnut Grove Elementary School District was disestablished due to insufficient numbers of students, so the southern portion was given to Wickenburg Unified.  no K-12 students lived in that section, and most of it was owned by the State of Arizona or the federal Bureau of Land Management.

Attendance area
It includes sections of Maricopa, and Yavapai counties, totaling . Additionally, in 2021 the district had some students from La Paz County.

Within Maricopa County, it includes that county's portion of Wickenburg and sections of Buckeye and Surprise. Within Yavapai County it includes that county's portion of Wickenburg and that county's section of Peoria.

In addition, Congress Elementary School District sends high school students to Wickenburg High. Previously students from the Yarnell Elementary School District (model Creek School) could select Wickenburg High as an option for high school, but in order to reduce taxes, the Yarnell Elementary district board removed the Wickenburg option in November 2018. Prior to 2001, when the Congress K-8 school opened, all levels of students in the Congress district went to Wickenburg schools.

Schools
 Wickenburg High School
 Vulture Peak Middle School
 Festival Foothills Elementary School
 Hassayampa Elementary School
 Wickenburg Virtual Academy

References

External links
 

School districts in Maricopa County, Arizona
School districts in Yavapai County, Arizona